Arnold William Boldt, OC (born September 16, 1957) is a Paralympics athlete from Canada. A leg amputee, he won seven gold medals in the Paralympic Games in the high jump and long jump. Boldt was inducted into the Canadian Sports Hall of Fame in 1977 and the Saskatchewan Sports Hall of Fame in 1980.

In 1979, a fictionalized account of Boldt's athletic career aired on CBC Television as the film Crossbar.

He returned to the Paralympic Games for the first time since 1992 by competing in the 2012 Summer Paralympics in para-cycling.

Awards and honours
In 1994, Boldt was inducted into the Terry Fox Hall of Fame.

References

Athletes (track and field) at the 1976 Summer Paralympics
Athletes (track and field) at the 1980 Summer Paralympics
Athletes (track and field) at the 1984 Summer Paralympics
Athletes (track and field) at the 1988 Summer Paralympics
Athletes (track and field) at the 1992 Summer Paralympics
Cyclists at the 2012 Summer Paralympics
Paralympic gold medalists for Canada
Paralympic silver medalists for Canada
Living people
Canadian amputees
1957 births
Paralympic track and field athletes of Canada
Canadian Disability Hall of Fame
Medalists at the 1976 Summer Paralympics
Medalists at the 1980 Summer Paralympics
Medalists at the 1984 Summer Paralympics
Medalists at the 1988 Summer Paralympics
Medalists at the 1992 Summer Paralympics
Paralympic medalists in athletics (track and field)
Canadian male long jumpers
Canadian male high jumpers
Officers of the Order of Canada
20th-century Canadian people
21st-century Canadian people
High jumpers with limb difference
Long jumpers with limb difference
Paralympic high jumpers
Paralympic long jumpers